The Koralionastetaceae are a family of fungi in the Ascomycota phylum. This family was taxonomically classified into class of Sordariomycetes and order of Koralionastetales. It contained the genus Koralionastes and then Pontogeneia  was added later.

References

External links
Index Fungorum

Sordariomycetes